Trn is a village 8 kilometers away from Bitola, a city in North Macedonia.

Demographics
According to the 2002 census, the village had a total of 113 inhabitants. Ethnic groups in the village include:

Macedonians 113

References

Villages in Bitola Municipality